Ponte Preta can refer to:

 Ponte Preta, Rio Grande do Sul, Brazilian municipality
 Associação Atlética Ponte Preta, Brazilian football team
 Arena Ponte Preta
 Ponte Preta Sumaré Futebol Clube, Brazilian football team